Kengtung Yazawin is a 19th-century Burmese chronicle that covers the history of the Shan state of Kengtung. It has been translated into English as the Padaeng Chronicle and the Jengtung State Chronicle by Sao Saimong Mangrai.

References

Bibliography
 
 

Burmese chronicles
Kengtung State